The Archaeology Museum of Sogamoso is a museum on the archaeological findings in the area of sacred City of the Sun Sogamoso, Boyacá, Colombia. The museum hosts 4000 pieces of the Muisca and the Herrera Period. The museum was founded in 1942 by archaeologist Eliécer Silva Celis who helped building the reconstruction of the Sun Temple in the museum. The archaeology museum is since 1953 curated by the Universidad Pedagógica y Tecnológica de Colombia, based in Tunja.

Description 
The museum contains an archaeological park, paleontology, pre-Columbian and Muisca sections. An area is dedicated to the mining of carbon, musical instruments and cloths of the Muisca, mummies, metallurgy and reconstructions of the bohíos (houses) of the Muisca.

The museum also hosts a sculpture of the last iraca of Sogamoso; Sugamuxi.

The museum organises workshops and around the winter solstice the Fiesta del Huán, related with the Conchucua fountain where the iraca would take his bath.

In 2015, a grave was discovered on the terrain of the museum.

Gallery

See also 

Muisca
Archeological Museum of Pasca

References

External links 

 Video of the museum

Tourist attractions in Boyacá Department
Archaeological museums in Colombia
1942 establishments in Colombia
Muisca
Buildings and structures in Sogamoso
Pedagogical and Technological University of Colombia